Gravenhorstiini is a large tribe of parasitoid wasps belonging to the family Ichneumonidae It contains all the genera of the subfamily Anomaloninae, excepting Anomalon.

Genera

 Agrypon Forster, 1860
 Aphanistes Forster, 1869
 Atrometoides Fahringer, 1922
 Atrometus Förster, 1869
 Aubertiana Viktorov, 1970
 Barylypa Forster, 1869
 Bimentum Townes, 1971
 Brachynervus Uchida, 1955
 Calcaneum Townes, 1971
 Castrosion Gauld & Bradshaw, 1997
 Cechenodes Townes, 1971
 Clatha Cameron, 1905
 Clypeocampulum Gauld, 1976
 Corsoncus Townes, 1971
 Elaticarina Sheng, 2012
 Encardia Tosquinet, 1896
 Erigorgus Förster, 1869
 Gravenhorstia Boie, 1836
 Habrocampulum Gauld, 1976
 Habronyx Foerster, 1868
 Helenanomalon Broad, 2014
 Heteropelma Wesmael, 1849
 Indagrypon Nikam, 1982
 Kokujewiella Shestakov, 1926
 Liopterna Townes, 1971
 Metoa Townes, 1971
 Neohabronyx Dasch, 1984
 Ophionellus Westwood, 1874
 Ophiopterus Brulle, 1846
 Parania Morley, 1913
 Perisphincter Townes, 1961
 Phaenolabrorychus Viereck, 1913
 Podogaster Brullé, 1846
 Porizonopteron Meier, 1931
 Pseudagrypon Lee & Kim, 1984
 Pseudanomalon Szépligeti, 1905
 Ribasia Ceballos, 1920
 Sphaeromanus Aubert, 1979
 Spolas Townes, 1961
 Stangepelma Porter, 1977
 Therion Curtis, 1829
 Trichomma Wesmael, 1849
 Vernamalon Gauld, 1976

References 

Ichneumonidae
Hymenoptera tribes